The 1973–74 Milwaukee Bucks season was the sixth season for the Bucks. It would also be Oscar Robertson’s last season in the league. This would be the most recent season that the Bucks clinch the best record in the league until the 2018–19 NBA season. It was also was the last time the Bucks would be conference champions until the 2020–21 NBA season.

Draft picks

Roster

Regular season

Season standings

Record vs. opponents

Game log

|-style="background:#bbffbb;"
| 1 || October 12, 1973 || @ Phoenix
| W 107–84
| Bob Dandridge (24)
| Kareem Abdul-Jabbar (17)
| Lucius Allen (7)
| Arizona Veterans Memorial Coliseum9,033
| 1-0
|-style="background:#bbffbb;"
| 2 || October 13, 1973 || @ Golden State
| W 97–85
| Kareem Abdul-Jabbar (29)
| Kareem Abdul-Jabbar (13)
| Lucius Allen (8)
| Oakland-Alameda County Coliseum Arena6,596
| 2-0
|-style="background:#fcc;"
| 3 || October 14, 1973 || @ Seattle
| L 100–109
| Bob Dandridge (24)
| Kareem Abdul-Jabbar (14)
| Oscar Robertson (9)
| Seattle Center Coliseum11,240
| 2-1
|-style="background:#bbffbb;"
| 4 || October 17, 1973 || Golden State
| W 95–109
| Kareem Abdul-Jabbar (22)
| Kareem Abdul-Jabbar (11)
| Lucius Allen (8)
| Milwaukee Arena9,189
| 3–1
|-style="background:#bbffbb;"
| 5 || October 19, 1973 || @ Detroit
| W 96–94
| Kareem Abdul-Jabbar (20)
| Kareem Abdul-Jabbar (12)
| Oscar Robertson (8)
| Cobo Arena10,645
| 4-1
|-style="background:#bbffbb;"
| 6 || October 20, 1973 || Cleveland
| W 88–101
| Kareem Abdul-Jabbar (33)
| Curtis Perry (11)
| Oscar Robertson (7)
| Milwaukee Arena8,837
| 5–1
|-style="background:#bbffbb;"
| 7 || October 24, 1973 || Buffalo
| W 113–130
| Kareem Abdul-Jabbar (31)
| Kareem Abdul-Jabbar (21)
| Dandridge, Robertson (8)
| Milwaukee Arena8,309
| 6–1
|-style="background:#bbffbb;"
| 8 || October 26, 1973 || @ Philadelphia
| W 98–92
| Kareem Abdul-Jabbar (35)
| Kareem Abdul-Jabbar (18)
| Oscar Robertson (7)
| Spectrum5,897
| 7-1
|-style="background:#bbffbb;"
| 9 || October 27, 1973 || Phoenix
| W 95–104
| Lucius Allen (23)
| Kareem Abdul-Jabbar (12)
| Oscar Robertson (8)
| Milwaukee Arena9,975
| 8-1
|-style="background:#bbffbb;"
| 10 || October 30, 1973 || @ Kansas City–Omaha
| W 112–78
| Lucius Allen (26)
| Kareem Abdul-Jabbar (9)
| Kareem Abdul-Jabbar (5)
| Kemper Arena5,540
| 9-1

|-style="background:#bbffbb;"
| 11 || November 2, 1973 || @ Cleveland
| W 118–100
| Kareem Abdul-Jabbar (35)
| Kareem Abdul-Jabbar (16)
| Kareem Abdul-Jabbar (11)
| Cleveland Arena5,361
| 10-1
|-style="background:#bbffbb;"
| 12 || November 3, 1973 || Detroit
| W 115–123 (OT)
| Bob Dandridge (31)
| Kareem Abdul-Jabbar (16)
| Lucius Allen (12)
| Milwaukee Arena10,938
| 11–1
|-style="background:#bbffbb;"
| 13 || November 7, 1973 || Los Angeles
| W 92–109
| Kareem Abdul-Jabbar (22)
| Kareem Abdul-Jabbar (21)
| Oscar Robertson (7)
| Milwaukee Arena10,938
| 12–1
|-style="background:#bbffbb;"
| 14 || November 10, 1973 || Kansas City–Omaha
| W 83–84
| Kareem Abdul-Jabbar (19)
| Kareem Abdul-Jabbar (19)
| Kareem Abdul-Jabbar (7)
| Milwaukee Arena8,725
| 13–1
|-style="background:#bbffbb;"
| 15 || November 11, 1973 || @ Capital
| W 110–91
| Abdul-Jabbar, Robertson (24)
| Kareem Abdul-Jabbar (19)
| Abdul-Jabbar, Allen (7)
| Cole Field House11,638
| 14–1
|-style="background:#bbffbb;"
| 16 || November 13, 1973 || Portland
| W 100–108
| Lucius Allen (29)
| Kareem Abdul-Jabbar (16)
| Oscar Robertson (8)
| Milwaukee Arena8,531
| 15–1
|-style="background:#fcc;"
| 17 || November 16, 1973 || @ Boston
| L 90–105
| Kareem Abdul-Jabbar (28)
| Kareem Abdul-Jabbar (9)
| Kareem Abdul-Jabbar (6)
| Boston Garden15,320
| 15–2
|-style="background:#fcc;"
| 18 || November 17, 1973 || @ New York
| L 93–100
| Kareem Abdul-Jabbar (24)
| Kareem Abdul-Jabbar (15)
| Oscar Robertson (6)
| Madison Square Garden19,694
| 15–3
|-style="background:#fcc;"
| 19 || November 20, 1973 || Golden State
| L 108–105
| Abdul-Jabbar, Dandridge (20)
| Kareem Abdul-Jabbar (11)
| Oscar Robertson (13)
| Milwaukee Arena9,975
| 15–4
|-style="background:#bbffbb;"
| 20 || November 22, 1973 || New York
| W 91–107
| Lucius Allen (27)
| Curtis Perry (17)
| Abdul-Jabbar, Allen (4)
| Milwaukee Arena10,938
| 16–4
|-style="background:#bbffbb;"
| 21 || November 24, 1973 || @ Atlanta
| W 112–92
| Bob Dandridge (30)
| Kareem Abdul-Jabbar (21)
| Oscar Robertson (10)
| The Omni9,111
| 17–4
|-style="background:#bbffbb;"
| 22 || November 25, 1973 || Philadelphia
| W 96–105
| Kareem Abdul-Jabbar (31)
| Kareem Abdul-Jabbar (17)
| Lucius Allen (7)
| Milwaukee Arena8,103
| 18–4
|-style="background:#bbffbb;"
| 23 || November 27, 1973 || @ Buffalo
| W 115–110
| Kareem Abdul-Jabbar (36)
| Kareem Abdul-Jabbar (16)
| Lucius Allen (9)
| Buffalo Memorial Auditorium8,169
| 19–4
|-style="background:#bbffbb;"
| 24 || November 28, 1973 || Seattle
| W 93–127
| Kareem Abdul-Jabbar (32)
| Bob Dandridge (16)
| Abdul-Jabbar, Robertson (8)
| Milwaukee Arena8,289
| 20–4
|-style="background:#bbffbb;"
| 25 || November 30, 1973 || Boston
| W 93–117
| Bob Dandridge (27)
| Kareem Abdul-Jabbar (14)
| Oscar Robertson (10)
| Milwaukee Arena10,938
| 21–4

|-style="background:#bbffbb;"
| 26 || December 4, 1973 || Houston
| W 109–124
| Kareem Abdul-Jabbar (32)
| Curtis Perry (17)
| Abdul-Jabbar, Perry (7)
| Milwaukee Arena7,889
| 22–4
|-style="background:#bbffbb;"
| 27 || December 7, 1973 || Portland
| W 86–116
| Allen, Dandridge (25)
| Kareem Abdul-Jabbar (15)
| Oscar Robertson (10)
| Milwaukee Arena8,796
| 23–4
|-style="background:#bbffbb;"
| 28 || December 8, 1973 || @ Philadelphia
| W 105–92
| Lucius Allen (21)
| Cornell Warner (12)
| Lucius Allen (6)
| Spectrum6,012
| 24–4
|-style="background:#bbffbb;"
| 29 || December 11, 1973 || Seattle
| W 91–130
| Lucius Allen (28)
| Curtis Perry (16)
| Oscar Robertson (9)
| Milwaukee Arena7,075
| 25–4
|-style="background:#fcc;"
| 30 || December 13, 1973 || Chicago
| L 97–94
| Kareem Abdul-Jabbar (23)
| Kareem Abdul-Jabbar (15)
| Oscar Robertson (13)
| Milwaukee Arena10,938
| 25–5
|-style="background:#bbffbb;"
| 31 || December 15, 1973 || Atlanta
| W 82–116
| Abdul-Jabbar, Dandridge (21)
| Kareem Abdul-Jabbar (12)
| Oscar Robertson (10)
| Milwaukee Arena9,785
| 26–5
|-style="background:#bbffbb;"
| 32 || December 16, 1973 || @ Portland
| W 121–98
| Kareem Abdul-Jabbar (32)
| Curtis Perry (13)
| Oscar Robertson (7)
| Memorial Coliseum9,034
| 27–5
|-style="background:#fcc;"
| 33 || December 18, 1973 || @ Los Angeles
| L 107–109
| Kareem Abdul-Jabbar (37)
| Kareem Abdul-Jabbar (24)
| Oscar Robertson (9)
| The Forum15,143
| 27–6
|-style="background:#fcc;"
| 34 || December 22, 1973 || @ Phoenix
| L 112–121
| Kareem Abdul-Jabbar (21)
| Curtis Perry (20)
| Kareem Abdul-Jabbar (8)
| Arizona Veterans Memorial Coliseum8,013
| 27–7
|-style="background:#bbffbb;"
| 35 || December 26, 1973 || Cleveland
| W 110–123
| Kareem Abdul-Jabbar (38)
| Curtis Perry (19)
| Lucius Allen (10)
| Milwaukee Arena9,986
| 28–7
|-style="background:#bbffbb;"
| 36 || December 27, 1973 || Philadelphia
| W 107–129
| Kareem Abdul-Jabbar (26)
| Kareem Abdul-Jabbar (14)
| Jon McGlocklin (9)
| Milwaukee Arena9,267
| 29–7
|-style="background:#bbffbb;"
| 37 || December 28, 1973 || @ Houston
| W 127–111
| Bob Dandridge (32)
| Kareem Abdul-Jabbar (16)
| Abdul-Jabbar, McGlocklin (9)
| Hofheinz Pavilion5,743
| 30–7
|-style="background:#fcc;"
| 38 || December 30, 1973 || Detroit
| L 98–91
| Kareem Abdul-Jabbar (30)
| Curtis Perry (15)
| Lucius Allen (7)
| Milwaukee Arena10,938
| 30–8

|-style="background:#fcc;"
| 39 || January 2, 1974 || @ Detroit
| L 92–106
| Lucius Allen (39)
| Kareem Abdul-Jabbar (9)
| Kareem Abdul-Jabbar (8)
| Cobo Arena10,513
| 30–9
|-style="background:#bbffbb;"
| 40 || January 3, 1974 || Kansas City–Omaha
| W 105–120
| Kareem Abdul-Jabbar (38)
| Kareem Abdul-Jabbar (16)
| Lucius Allen (9)
| Milwaukee Arena9,936
| 31–9
|-style="background:#bbffbb;"
| 41 || January 5, 1974 || Phoenix
| W 109–118
| Kareem Abdul-Jabbar (34)
| Kareem Abdul-Jabbar (13)
| Lucius Allen (8)
| Milwaukee Arena9,812
| 32–9
|-style="background:#fcc;"
| 42 || January 6, 1974 || @ Capital
| L 88–90
| Kareem Abdul-Jabbar (25)
| Kareem Abdul-Jabbar (15)
| Ron Williams (7)
| Capital Centre17,246
| 32–10
|-style="background:#bbffbb;"
| 43 || January 11, 1974 || Capital
| W 113–115 (OT)
| Kareem Abdul-Jabbar (34)
| Kareem Abdul-Jabbar (22)
| McGlocklin, Williams (6)
| Milwaukee Arena9,683
| 33–10
|-style="background:#bbffbb;"
| 44 || January 12, 1974 || @ Chicago
| W 101–82
| Lucius Allen (24)
| Kareem Abdul-Jabbar (23)
| Lucius Allen (11)
| Chicago Stadium18,597
| 34–10
|-style="background:#bbffbb;"
| 45 || January 13, 1974 || Chicago
| W 94–124
| Kareem Abdul-Jabbar (23)
| Kareem Abdul-Jabbar (11)
| Lucius Allen (11)
| Milwaukee Arena10,938
| 35–10
|-style="background:#bbffbb;"
| 46 || January 19, 1974 || Portland
| W 106–121
| Kareem Abdul-Jabbar (34)
| Curtis Perry (16)
| Jon McGlocklin (7)
| Milwaukee Arena9,687
| 36–10
|-style="background:#bbffbb;"
| 47 || January 20, 1974 || Los Angeles
| W 90–94
| Kareem Abdul-Jabbar (39)
| Kareem Abdul-Jabbar (22)
| Allen, McGlocklin (6)
| Milwaukee Arena10,938
| 37–10
|-style="background:#bbffbb;"
| 48 || January 23, 1974 || N Buffalo
| W 114–88
| Kareem Abdul-Jabbar (38)
| Kareem Abdul-Jabbar (12)
| Abdul-Jabbar, Robertson (7)
| Wisconsin Field House7,325
| 38–10
|-style="background:#bbffbb;"
| 49 || January 25, 1974 || @ Phoenix
| W 112–108
| Kareem Abdul-Jabbar (31)
| Kareem Abdul-Jabbar (17)
| Kareem Abdul-Jabbar (10)
| Arizona Veterans Memorial Coliseum7,660
| 39–10
|-style="background:#fcc;"
| 50 || January 27, 1974 || @ Los Angeles
| L 92–99
| Kareem Abdul-Jabbar (25)
| Kareem Abdul-Jabbar (24)
| McGlocklin, Robertson (7)
| The Forum17,505
| 39–11
|-style="background:#bbffbb;"
| 51 || January 29, 1974 || @ Portland
| W 126–106
| Kareem Abdul-Jabbar (25)
| Curtis Perry (16)
| Lucius Allen (10)
| Memorial Coliseum6,501
| 40–11

|-style="background:#fcc;"
| 52 || February 1, 1974 || @ Seattle
| L 85–110
| Abdul-Jabbar, Dandridge (18)
| Kareem Abdul-Jabbar (16)
| Kareem Abdul-Jabbar (6)
| Seattle Center Coliseum14,017
| 40–12
|-style="background:#fcc;"
| 53 || February 2, 1974 || @ Golden State
| L 91–120
| Kareem Abdul-Jabbar (23)
| Kareem Abdul-Jabbar (12)
| McGlocklin, Robertson (5)
| Oakland-Alameda County Coliseum Arena11,606
| 40–13
|-style="background:#bbffbb;"
| 54 || February 5, 1974 || @ Cleveland
| W 102–87
| Kareem Abdul-Jabbar (33)
| Kareem Abdul-Jabbar (18)
| Lucius Allen (10)
| Cleveland Arena5,291
| 41–13
|-style="background:#fcc;"
| 55 || February 6, 1974 || Boston
| L 105–104
| Kareem Abdul-Jabbar (32)
| Kareem Abdul-Jabbar (13)
| Kareem Abdul-Jabbar (6)
| Milwaukee Arena10,938
| 41–14
|-style="background:#bbffbb;"
| 56 || February 8, 1974 || Capital
| W 96–105
| Lucius Allen (28)
| Cornell Warner (19)
| Oscar Robertson (5)
| Milwaukee Arena10,121
| 42–14
|-style="background:#bbffbb;"
| 57 || February 10, 1974 || N Boston
| W 95–86
| Kareem Abdul-Jabbar (28)
| Kareem Abdul-Jabbar (21)
| Kareem Abdul-Jabbar (4)
| Providence Civic Center11,671
| 43–14
|-style="background:#fcc;"
| 58 || February 12, 1974 || @ Chicago
| L 81–93
| Kareem Abdul-Jabbar (30)
| Kareem Abdul-Jabbar (15)
| Jon McGlocklin (7)
| Chicago Stadium16,487
| 43–15
|-style="background:#bbffbb;"
| 59 || February 14, 1974 || @ Detroit
| W 102–99
| Kareem Abdul-Jabbar (27)
| Oscar Robertson (10)
| Oscar Robertson (9)
| Cobo Arena11,385
| 44–15
|-style="background:#fcc;"
| 60 || February 15, 1974 || Chicago
| L 92–90
| Kareem Abdul-Jabbar (27)
| Bob Dandridge (14)
| Jon McGlocklin (5)
| Milwaukee Arena10,938
| 44–16
|-style="background:#bbffbb;"
| 61 || February 17, 1974 || New York
| W 86–97
| Kareem Abdul-Jabbar (32)
| Kareem Abdul-Jabbar (23)
| Abdul-Jabbar, Robertson (6)
| Milwaukee Arena10,938
| 45–16
|-style="background:#fcc;"
| 62 || February 19, 1974 || @ Buffalo
| L 109–145
| Kareem Abdul-Jabbar (38)
| Kareem Abdul-Jabbar (11)
| Lucius Allen (8)
| Buffalo Memorial Auditorium15,676
| 45–17
|-style="background:#bbffbb;"
| 63 || February 20, 1974 || N Atlanta
| W 110–94
| Kareem Abdul-Jabbar (32)
| Curtis Perry (19)
| Oscar Robertson (9)
| Wisconsin Field House9,455
| 46–17
|-style="background:#bbffbb;"
| 64 || February 22, 1974 || @ Houston
| W 122–113
| Kareem Abdul-Jabbar (38)
| Curtis Perry (12)
| Oscar Robertson (8)
| Hofheinz Pavilion8,253
| 47–17
|-style="background:#bbffbb;"
| 65 || February 24, 1974 || @ Kansas City–Omaha
| W 100–93
| Lucius Allen (31)
| Curtis Perry (15)
| Lucius Allen (6)
| Kemper Arena8,849
| 48–17
|-style="background:#fcc;"
| 66 || February 27, 1974 || Los Angeles
| L 110–108
| Kareem Abdul-Jabbar (33)
| Kareem Abdul-Jabbar (16)
| Lucius Allen (6)
| Milwaukee Arena10,938
| 48–18
|-style="background:#bbffbb;"
| 67 || February 28, 1974 || Detroit
| W 90–113
| Lucius Allen (27)
| Curtis Perry (11)
| Kareem Abdul-Jabbar (9)
| Milwaukee Arena10,938
| 49–18

|-style="background:#fcc;"
| 68 || March 1, 1974 || @ Atlanta
| L 89–105
| Ron Williams (16)
| Kareem Abdul-Jabbar (11)
| Lucius Allen (5)
| The Omni8,470
| 49–19
|-style="background:#bbffbb;"
| 69 || March 2, 1974 || Seattle
| W 99–116
| Kareem Abdul-Jabbar (31)
| Kareem Abdul-Jabbar (15)
| Oscar Robertson (9)
| Milwaukee Arena10,938
| 50–19
|-style="background:#bbffbb;"
| 70 || March 3, 1974 || N Houston
| W 112–106 (OT)
| Kareem Abdul-Jabbar (44)
| Kareem Abdul-Jabbar (12)
| Oscar Robertson (17)
| Wisconsin Field House7,889
| 51–19
|-style="background:#bbffbb;"
| 71 || March 4, 1974 || Kansas City–Omaha
| W 103–109
| Lucius Allen (21)
| Abdul-Jabbar, Warner (12)
| Lucius Allen (7)
| Milwaukee Arena9,012
| 52–19
|-style="background:#bbffbb;"
| 72 || March 6, 1974 || @ Kansas City–Omaha
| W 111–99
| Kareem Abdul-Jabbar (25)
| Mickey Davis (16)
| Lucius Allen (5)
| Omaha Civic Auditorium7,182
| 53–19
|-style="background:#fcc;"
| 73 || March 7, 1974 || Golden State
| L 97–95
| Lucius Allen (31)
| Kareem Abdul-Jabbar (17)
| Oscar Robertson (7)
| Milwaukee Arena10,317
| 53–20
|-style="background:#fcc;"
| 74 || March 9, 1974 || @ New York
| L 75–88
| Kareem Abdul-Jabbar (27)
| Abdul-Jabbar, Allen (10)
| Dandridge, Robertson (4)
| Madison Square Garden19,694
| 53–21
|-style="background:#bbffbb;"
| 75 || March 11, 1974 || Phoenix
| W 92–105
| Abdul-Jabbar, Allen (18)
| Kareem Abdul-Jabbar (15)
| Allen, Robertson (8)
| Milwaukee Arena9,027
| 54–21
|-style="background:#fcc;"
| 76 || March 15, 1974 || @ Detroit
| L 89–93
| Bob Dandridge (31)
| Kareem Abdul-Jabbar (15)
| Ron Williams (6)
| Cobo Arena11,267
| 54–22
|-style="background:#bbffbb;"
| 77 || March 17, 1974 || @ Chicago
| W 107–82
| Kareem Abdul-Jabbar (38)
| Kareem Abdul-Jabbar (22)
| Dandridge, Robertson (5)
| Chicago Stadium18,542
| 55–22
|-style="background:#bbffbb;"
| 78 || March 19, 1974 || @ Golden State
| W 111–100
| Kareem Abdul-Jabbar (31)
| Abdul-Jabbar, Robertson (10)
| Oscar Robertson (10)
| Oakland-Alameda County Coliseum Arena11,365
| 56–22
|-style="background:#fcc;"
| 79 || March 20, 1974 || @ Los Angeles
| L 114–120
| Kareem Abdul-Jabbar (27)
| Kareem Abdul-Jabbar (17)
| Oscar Robertson (9)
| The Forum17,387
| 56–23
|-style="background:#bbffbb;"
| 80 || March 22, 1974 || @ Seattle
| W 106–101
| Kareem Abdul-Jabbar (40)
| Kareem Abdul-Jabbar (21)
| Kareem Abdul-Jabbar (7)
| Seattle Center Coliseum13,771
| 57–23
|-style="background:#bbffbb;"
| 81 || March 24, 1974 || @ Portland
| W 120–110
| Kareem Abdul-Jabbar (43)
| Kareem Abdul-Jabbar (13)
| Dandridge, Robertson (10)
| Memorial Coliseum7,709
| 58–23
|-style="background:#bbffbb;"
| 82 || March 26, 1974 || Kansas City–Omaha
| W 98–118
| Bob Dandridge (23)
| Cornell Warner (18)
| Oscar Robertson (9)
| Milwaukee Arena10,938
| 59–23

Playoffs

|- align="center" bgcolor="#ccffcc"
| 1
| March 29
| Los Angeles
| W 99–95
| Kareem Abdul-Jabbar (35)
| Kareem Abdul-Jabbar (21)
| Oscar Robertson (9)
| Milwaukee Arena10,938
| 1–0
|- align="center" bgcolor="#ccffcc"
| 2
| March 31
| Los Angeles
| W 109–90
| Kareem Abdul-Jabbar (32)
| Kareem Abdul-Jabbar (25)
| Oscar Robertson (9)
| Milwaukee Arena10,938
| 2–0
|- align="center" bgcolor="#ffcccc"
| 3
| April 2
| @ Los Angeles
| L 96–98
| Kareem Abdul-Jabbar (29)
| Kareem Abdul-Jabbar (15)
| Oscar Robertson (16)
| The Forum17,505
| 2–1
|- align="center" bgcolor="#ccffcc"
| 4
| April 4
| @ Los Angeles
| W 112–90
| Kareem Abdul-Jabbar (31)
| Kareem Abdul-Jabbar (16)
| Oscar Robertson (9)
| The Forum17,505
| 3–1
|- align="center" bgcolor="#ccffcc"
| 5
| April 7
| Los Angeles
| W 114–92
| Ron Williams (22)
| Cornell Warner (17)
| Abdul-Jabbar, Robertson (8)
| Milwaukee Arena10,938
| 4–1
|-

|- align="center" bgcolor="#ccffcc"
| 1
| April 16
| Chicago
| W 101–85
| Abdul-Jabbar, Dandridge (25)
| Kareem Abdul-Jabbar (19)
| Oscar Robertson (10)
| Milwaukee Arena10,938
| 1–0
|- align="center" bgcolor="#ccffcc"
| 2
| April 18
| @ Chicago
| W 113–111
| Kareem Abdul-Jabbar (44)
| Kareem Abdul-Jabbar (21)
| Oscar Robertson (8)
| Chicago Stadium17,787
| 2–0
|- align="center" bgcolor="#ccffcc"
| 3
| April 20
| Chicago
| W 113–90
| Kareem Abdul-Jabbar (32)
| Kareem Abdul-Jabbar (14)
| Oscar Robertson (12)
| Milwaukee Arena10,938
| 3–0
|- align="center" bgcolor="#ccffcc"
| 4
| April 22
| @ Chicago
| W 115–99
| Kareem Abdul-Jabbar (38)
| Kareem Abdul-Jabbar (24)
| Oscar Robertson (10)
| Chicago Stadium12,762
| 4–0
|-

|- align="center" bgcolor="#ffcccc"
| 1
| April 28
| Boston
| L 83–98
| Kareem Abdul-Jabbar (35)
| Kareem Abdul-Jabbar (14)
| Oscar Robertson (8)
| Milwaukee Arena10,938
| 0–1
|- align="center" bgcolor="#ccffcc"
| 2
| April 30
| Boston
| W 105–96 (OT)
| Kareem Abdul-Jabbar (36)
| Kareem Abdul-Jabbar (15)
| Oscar Robertson (9)
| Milwaukee Arena10,938
| 1–1
|- align="center" bgcolor="#ffcccc"
| 3
| May 3
| @ Boston
| L 83–95
| Kareem Abdul-Jabbar (26)
| Abdul-Jabbar, Warner (10)
| Abdul-Jabbar, Robertson (5)
| Boston Garden15,320
| 1–2
|- align="center" bgcolor="#ccffcc"
| 4
| May 5
| @ Boston
| W 97–89
| Kareem Abdul-Jabbar (34)
| Kareem Abdul-Jabbar (14)
| Oscar Robertson (9)
| Boston Garden15,320
| 2–2
|- align="center" bgcolor="#ffcccc"
| 5
| May 7
| Boston
| L 87–96
| Kareem Abdul-Jabbar (37)
| Kareem Abdul-Jabbar (11)
| Jon McGlocklin (8)
| Milwaukee Arena10,938
| 2–3
|- align="center" bgcolor="#ccffcc"
| 6
| May 10
| @ Boston
| W 102–101 (2OT)
| Kareem Abdul-Jabbar (34)
| four players tied (8)
| Oscar Robertson (10)
| Boston Garden15,320
| 3–3
|- align="center" bgcolor="#ffcccc"
| 7
| May 12
| Boston
| L 87–102
| Kareem Abdul-Jabbar (26)
| Kareem Abdul-Jabbar (13)
| Oscar Robertson (11)
| Milwaukee Arena10,938
| 3–4
|-

Player statistics

Season

Playoffs

Awards and records
 Kareem Abdul-Jabbar, NBA Most Valuable Player Award
 Kareem Abdul-Jabbar, All-NBA First Team
 Kareem Abdul-Jabbar, NBA All-Defensive First Team

Transactions

Free agents

References

External links
 Bucks on Database Basketball
 Bucks on Basketball Reference
 

Milwaukee
Western Conference (NBA) championship seasons
Milwaukee Bucks seasons
Milwau
Milwau